Ralte L. Thanmawia is an Indian educationist and writer from Mizoram.

Education
Dr Ralte L Thanmawia completed his Bachelors in 1979 and his Masters in 1981 and finally completed his Phd in 1989 from NEHU.

Career
He started his career as LDC with Government of Mizoram in 1976 and then worked in Government Aizawl College in 1981, then joined Pachhunga University College in 1989  and finally joined Mizoram University in 2004 where he remains there till today with the Mizo Department. He is the incumbent Controller of Examinations of Mizoram University, a post he has been holding since 2011.

Awards and Honros
 Thanmawia was honored by the Government of India, in 2012, with the fourth highest Indian civilian award of Padma Shri.
 He was also awarded the Mizo Academy of Letters in 2016.

Publications
Some of the Publications by Prof L Thanmawia are:
 KathiPekCheKha - 1987  
 Hla Thu Hrilhfiahna - 1988  
 ZofateRohlu - 1992  
 ZinkawngRapthlakZawhtute - 1994  
 Chuailo I - 1997/2011  
 Senmei (Poetry) - 1997  
 Mizo Poetry - 1998  
 Ngirtling - 2005   (2005)
 Lung Min Lentu - 2006  
 Mizo HnahthlakThawnthuVol-I - 2008/2018 98-81-935328-7-4  
 Chuailo 2 - 2010  
 Mizo Values - 2011  
 Mizo HnahthlakThawnthuVol.III - 2012  
 Mizo HlaHlui - 2012/2018 978-81- 935328-  
 ZasiamalehSialkhawthanga - 2012  
 Chuailo 3 - 2015  
 Hla Thu Dictionary - 2016 978-93-85263-49- 1  
 ZanlaiThlifim - 2016/2018 978-81- 935455-8-4  
. Mizo Folktales - 2017 978-81- 260537-0-1 
 Chuailo 4 - 2018 978-81-935455-9-1  
 Prepared & Pub. Mizo Cultural & Historical Map - 2009

See also

 Mizoram University

References

External links
 

Living people
Recipients of the Padma Shri in literature & education
Scholars from Mizoram
Indian male poets
Writers from Mizoram
20th-century Indian educational theorists
1958 births